KhK Kuzbass is a professional bandy club from Kemerovo, Russia, established in 1948. It plays in the Russian Bandy Super League, the top division of Russian bandy. The home games are played at Khimik Stadium in Kemerovo. While during the 2016-17 season, the indoor arena was their base, 2017-18 it will be Khimik again. The club colours are dark orange, white and black and the club logo also includes the arms of Kemerovo.

It was founded in 1948 as Shakhtyor and played in the top division from 1955. The club changed its name to Kuzbass in 1972.

Honours

Domestic
 Russian Champions:
 Runners-up (4): 2004, 2005, 2006, 2009

Cup
 Russian Bandy Cup:
 Winners (3): 2001, 2003, 2007

References

External links
 Official website
Team image

 
Bandy clubs in Russia
Bandy clubs in the Soviet Union
Sport in Kemerovo
Bandy clubs established in 1936
1936 establishments in Russia